Gastrocopta klunzingeri is a species of gastropods belonging to the family Gastrocoptidae.

The species is found in Africa. The species inhabits terrestrial environments.

References

Gastrocoptidae